NGC 4490, also known as the Cocoon Galaxy, is a barred spiral galaxy in the constellation Canes Venatici. It lies at a distance of 25 million light years from Earth. It interacts with its smaller companion NGC 4485 and as a result is a starburst galaxy. NGC 4490 and NGC 4485 are collectively known in the Atlas of Peculiar Galaxies as Arp 269. NGC 4490 is located 3/4° northwest of beta Canum Venaticorum and with apparent visual magnitude 9.8, can be observed with 15x100 binoculars. It is a member of the Herschel 400 Catalogue. It belongs in Canes Venatici galaxy cloud II.

It was discovered by William Herschel in 1788. Two supernovae have been observed in NGC 4490, SN 1982F, and type II-P SN 2008ax, with peak magnitude 13.0.

Gallery

See also 
 Barred spiral galaxy 
 Canes Venatici (constellation)

References

External links 

 
 SEDS

Canes II Group
Canes Venatici
Barred spiral galaxies
Starburst galaxies
4490
07651
41333
Discoveries by William Herschel
269